This list of mountains in Bavaria shows a selection of high and/or well-known mountains in the German state of Bavaria.

Highest mountains by province 
In the following table, the highest mountain in each of the 7 Bavarian provinces is listed.

By clicking on the word "list" in the mountain list column you will be taken to the list of mountains in that region (sometimes including those lying outside of Bavaria). The table is initially sorted by height, but may be rearranged by clicking the symbols at the head of each column.

Highest mountains and hills of the regions of Bavaria 

In the following table the highest mountain or hill in each of the regions of Bavaria is shown. A ‘region’ is taken to be a major natural region unit.

In the column Range/Region”, high or extensive mountain ranges are shown in bold, lower or smaller hills and regions, which do not have a local high point or basin, but whose (island-like) high points have prominence are shown in italics. By clicking the word “list” in the mountain lists column, you will be taken to a list of other mountains or hills in the respective region (some of which may included those outside of Bavaria).

Multiple listings of the same mountain are possible because, e.g., the Zugspitze is simultaneously the highest (Bavarian) mountain of the Alps, Bavarian Alps, Northern Limestone Alps and the Wetterstein Mountains.

The table, which is initially sorted by height, may be rearranged by clicking on the symbols at the head of each column.

 Mountains and hills of Bavaria 
The following section contains a selection of Bavarian mountains and hills in the seven provinces, sorted alphabetically, in each case in order of descending height:

Name, Height in metres above sea level, Location (District/Region)

 Upper Bavaria 
 Zugspitze (2,962 m), Garmisch-Partenkirchen district, Wetterstein mountains, Alps
 Schneefernerkopf (2,875 m), Garmisch-Partenkirchen district, Wetterstein mountains, Alps
 Wetterspitzen (2,747 m), Garmisch-Partenkirchen district, Wetterstein mountains, Alps
 Hochwanner (2,746 m), Garmisch-Partenkirchen district, Wetterstein mountains, Alps
 Mittlere Höllentalspitze (2,743 m), Garmisch-Partenkirchen district, Wetterstein mountains, Alps
 Watzmann-Mittelspitze (2,713 m), Berchtesgadener Land, Berchtesgaden Alps, Alps
 Watzmann-Südspitze (2,712 m),  Berchtesgadener Land, Berchtesgaden Alps
 Hochblassen (2,707 m), Garmisch-Partenkirchen district, Wetterstein mountains, Alps
 Leutascher Dreitorspitze (2,682 m), Garmisch-Partenkirchen district, Wetterstein mountains, Alps
 Plattspitzen (2,680 m), Garmisch-Partenkirchen district, Wetterstein mountains, Alps
 Hinterreintalschrofen (2,669 m), Garmisch-Partenkirchen district, Wetterstein mountains, Alps
 Hocheck (2,651 m),  Berchtesgadener Land, Berchtesgaden Alps
 Alpspitze (2,628 m), Garmisch-Partenkirchen district, Wetterstein mountains, Alps
 Hochkalter (2,607 m),  Berchtesgadener Land, Berchtesgaden Alps
 Großer Hundstod (2,593 m),  Berchtesgadener Land, Berchtesgaden Alps
 Funtenseetauern (2,578 m),  Berchtesgadener Land, Berchtesgaden Alps
  (2,543 m),  Berchtesgadener Land, Berchtesgaden Alps
 Östliche Karwendelspitze (2,538 m), Garmisch-Partenkirchen district, Karwendel mountains, Alps
 Hocheisspitze (2,523 m),  Berchtesgadener Land, Berchtesgaden Alps
 Oberreintalschrofen (2,523 m), Garmisch-Partenkirchen district, Wetterstein mountains, Alps
 Hoher Göll (2,522 m),  Berchtesgadener Land, Berchtesgaden Alps
 Hochkarspitze (2,484 m), Garmisch-Partenkirchen district, Karwendel mountains, Alps
 Wettersteinkopf (2,483 m), Garmisch-Partenkirchen district, Wetterstein mountains
 Wörner (Alps) (2,476 m), Garmisch-Partenkirchen district, Karwendel mountains, Alps
 Steintalhörnl (2,468 m),  Berchtesgadener Land, Berchtesgaden Alps
 Westliche Karwendelspitze (2,385 m), Garmisch-Partenkirchen district, Karwendel mountains, Alps
 Großes Teufelshorn (2,361 m),  Berchtesgadener Land, Berchtesgaden Alps
 Alpriedlhorn (2,351 m),  Berchtesgadener Land, Berchtesgaden Alps
 Kahlersberg (2,350 m),  Berchtesgadener Land, Berchtesgaden Alps
 Hohes Brett (2,340 m),  Berchtesgadener Land, Berchtesgaden Alps
 Schneiber (2,330 m),  Berchtesgadener Land, Berchtesgaden Alps
 Raffelspitze (2,324 m), Garmisch-Partenkirchen district, Karwendel mountains, Alps
 Watzmannfrau (2,307 m; Kleiner Watzmann),  Berchtesgadener Land district, Berchtesgaden Alps
 Stadelhorn (2,286 m),  Berchtesgadener Land, Berchtesgaden Alps
 Obere Wettersteinspitze (2,280 m), Garmisch-Partenkirchen district, Wetterstein mountains, Alps
 Waxenstein (2,276 m), Garmisch-Partenkirchen district, Wetterstein mountains, Alps
 Watzmannkinder (to 2,270 m; five peaks),  Berchtesgadener Land, Berchtesgaden Alps
 Wildalmriedl (2,268 m),  Berchtesgadener Land, Berchtesgaden Alps
 Schneibstein (2,276 m),  Berchtesgadener Land, Berchtesgaden Alps
 Soiernspitze (2,259 m), Garmisch-Partenkirchen district, Karwendel mountains, Alps
 Grießspitze (2,257 m),  Berchtesgadener Land, Berchtesgaden Alps
 Alpelhorn (2,254 m),  Berchtesgadener Land, Berchtesgaden Alps
 Watzmann-Jungfrau (2,225 m),  Berchtesgadener Land, Berchtesgaden Alps
 Großes Palfenhorn (2,222 m),  Berchtesgadener Land, Berchtesgaden Alps
 Windschartenkopf (2,211 m),  Berchtesgadener Land, Berchtesgaden Alps
 Große Arnspitze (2,196 m), Garmisch-Partenkirchen district, Wetterstein mountains, Alps
 Karlkopf (2,195 m),  Berchtesgadener Land, Berchtesgaden Alps
 Kreuzspitze (2,185 m), Garmisch-Partenkirchen district, Ammergau Alps
 Rotwandlspitze (2,180 m), Garmisch-Partenkirchen district, Karwendel mountains, Alps
 Hirschwiese (2,114 m),  Berchtesgadener Land, Berchtesgaden Alps
 Schafreuter (2,102 m), Bad Tölz-Wolfratshausen, Karwendel mountains, Alps
 Krottenkopf (2,086 m), Garmisch-Partenkirchen district, Ester Mountains, Alps
 Große Hachelkopf (2,066 m),  Berchtesgadener Land, Berchtesgaden Alps
 Hachelköpfe (2,066 m),  Berchtesgadener Land, Berchtesgaden Alps
 Schöttelkarspitze (2,049 m), Garmisch-Partenkirchen district, Karwendel mountains, Alps
 Schottmalhorn (Reiter Alm) (2,045 m),  Berchtesgadener Land, Berchtesgaden Alps
 Sonntagshorn (1,961 m),  Berchtesgadener Land, Chiemgau Alps
 Falzköpfl (1,915 m),  Berchtesgadener Land, Berchtesgaden Alps
 Berchtesgadener Hochthron (1,973 m),  Berchtesgadener Land, Untersberg
 Rotwand (1,884 m), Miesbach district, Mangfall Mountains, Alps
 Großer Traithen (1,852 m), Rosenheim district, Mangfall Mountains, Alps
 Wendelstein (1,838 m), Rosenheim district, Mangfall Mountains, Alps
 Kehlstein (1,834 m),  Berchtesgadener Land, Berchtesgaden Alps
 Risserkogel (1,826 m), Miesbach district, Mangfall Mountains, Alps
 Mooslahnerkopf (1,815 m),  Berchtesgadener Land district, Berchtesgaden Alps
 Geigelstein (1,813 m), Traunstein district, Chiemgau Alps
 Ruchenköpfe (1,805 m), Miesbach district, Mangfall Mountains, Alps
 Benediktenwand (1,801 m), Bad Tölz-Wolfratshausen, Bavarian Prealps
 Heimgarten (1,790 m), Bad Tölz-Wolfratshausen, Bavarian Prealps
 Zwiesel (mountain) (1,782 m),  Berchtesgadener Land, Chiemgau Alps
 Dürrnbachhorn (1,776 m), Traunstein district, Chiemgau Alps
 Kotzen (1,776 m), Vorkarwendel
 Hochstaufen (1,771 m),  Berchtesgadener Land, Chiemgau Alps
 Plankenstein (mountain) (1,768 m), Miesbach district, Mangfall Mountains, Alps
 Hochgern (1,748 m), Traunstein district, Chiemgau Alps
 Karkopf (1,738 m),  Berchtesgadener Land, Lattengebirge
 Herzogstand (1,731 m), Bad Tölz-Wolfratshausen, Bavarian Prealps
 Roß- und Buchstein (1,698 m and 1,701 m), Bavarian Prealps
 Hörndlwand (1,684 m), Traunstein district, Chiemgau Alps
 Brecherspitz (1,683 m), Miesbach district, Mangfall Mountains, Alps
 Dreisesselberg (1,680 m),  Berchtesgadener Land, Latten Mountains
 Hochfelln (1,674 m), Traunstein district, Chiemgau Alps
 Kampenwand (1,669 m), Rosenheim district, Chiemgau Alps
 Bodenschneid (1,668 m), Miesbach district, Schliersee Mountains, Bavarian Prealps
 Brünnstein (1,619 m), Rosenheim district, Mangfall Mountains, Alps
 Predigtstuhl (1,613 m),  Berchtesgadener Land district, Lattengebirge
 Rinnerspitz (1,611 m), Miesbach district, Schliersee Mountains, Bavarian Pre-alps
 Roßkopf (1,580 m), Miesbach district, Schliersee Mountains, Bavarian Prealps
 Jochköpfl (1,575 m), Berchtesgadener Land, Latten Mountains
 Brauneck (1,555 m), Bad Tölz-Wolfratshausen, Bavarian Prealps
 Aufacker (1,542 m), Garmisch-Partenkirchen district, Ammergebirge
 Teisenberg (1,334 m),  Berchtesgadener Land, Rupertigau
 Grünstein (Watzmann) (1,304 m),  Berchtesgadener Land, Berchtesgaden Alps, Watzmannstock
 Zinnkopf (1,227 m), Traunstein district, Chiemgau Alps
 Heiglkopf (1,205 m), Bad Tölz-Wolfratshausen district, Bavarian Prealps
 Dötzenkopf (1,001 m),  Berchtesgadener Land, Berchtesgaden Alps
 Hoher Peißenberg (987 m), Weilheim-Schongau district, Ammergebirge
 Högl (827 m),  Berchtesgadener Land, Högl

 Swabia 
 Hochfrottspitze (2,649 m), Oberallgäu district, Allgäu Alps, Alps
 Mädelegabel (2,645 m), Oberallgäu district, Allgäu Alps
 Biberkopf (2,599 m), Oberallgäu district, Allgäu Alps
 Trettachspitze (2,595 m), Oberallgäu district, Allgäu Alps
 Hochvogel (2,593 m), Oberallgäu district, Allgäu Alps
 Kratzer (2,428 m), Oberallgäu district, Allgäu Alps
 Großer Wilder (2,381 m), Oberallgäu district, Allgäu Alps
 Großer Daumen (2,280 m), Oberallgäu district, Allgäu Alps
 Hammerspitze (2,260 m), Oberallgäu district, Allgäu Alps
 Hoher Ifen (2,230 m), Oberallgäu district, Allgäu Alps
 Nebelhorn (2,224 m), Oberallgäu district, Allgäu Alps
 Hochplatte (2,082 m), Ostallgäu district, Ammergau Alps
 Warmatsgundkopf (bzw. Kanzelwand) (2,059 m), Oberallgäu district, Allgäu Alps
 Säuling (2,047 m), Ostallgäu district, Ammergau Alps
 Fellhorn (2,038 m), Oberallgäu district, Allgäu Alps
 Aggenstein (1,987 m), Oberallgäu district, Tannheimer mountains, Alps
 Grünten (1,738 m), Oberallgäu district, Allgäu Alps
 Tegelberg (1,720 m), Ostallgäu district, Ammergau Alps

 Lower Bavaria 
 Großer Arber (1,456 m), Regen district, Bavarian Forest
 Großer Rachel (1,453 m), Freyung-Grafenau district, Bavarian Forest
 Kleiner Rachel (1,399 m), Freyung-Grafenau district, Bavarian Forest
 Plattenhausenriegel (1,376 m), Freyung-Grafenau district, Bavarian Forest
 Lusen (1,373 m), Freyung-Grafenau district, Bavarian Forest
 Bayerischer Plöckenstein (1,363 m), Freyung-Grafenau district, junction of Germany-Austria-Czech Republic, Bavarian Forest
 Lackenberg (1,337 m), Regen district, Bavarian Forest on the border of the Czech Republic
 Dreisesselberg (1,333 m), Freyung-Grafenau district, Bavarian Forest
 Großer Falkenstein (1,312 m), Regen district, Bavarian Forest
 Steinfleckberg (1,283 m), Freyung-Grafenau district, Bavarian Forest
 Rukowitzberg (1,269 m), Regen district, Bavarian Forest
 Kiesruck (1,265 m), Regen district, Bavarian Forest
 Siebensteinkopf (1,263 m), Freyung-Grafenau district, Bavarian Forest
 Hahnenbogen (1,257 m), Regen district, Bavarian Forest
 Hohlstein (1,196 m), Freyung-Grafenau district, Bavarian Forest
 Kleiner Falkenstein (1,190 m), Regen district, Bavarian Forest
 Hochzellberg (1,182 m), Regen district, Bavarian Forest
 Haidel (1,167 m), Freyung-Grafenau district, Bavarian Forest
 Waldhäuserriegel (1,151 m), Landkreis Freyung Grafenau, Bavarian Forest
 Sulzberg (1,146 m), Freyung-Grafenau district, Bavarian Forest
 Almberg (1,139 m), Freyung-Grafenau district, Bavarian Forest
 Großer Riedelstein (1,132 m), on the border between Regen district and Cham district, Bavarian Forest
 Steinkopf (Spiegelau) (1,131 m), Freyung-Grafenau district, Bavarian Forest
 Reischfleck (1,126 m), Regen district, Bavarian Forest
 Einödriegel (1,121 m), Deggendorf district, Bavarian Forest
 Breitenauriegel (1,114 m), Deggendorf district, Bavarian Forest
 Alzenberg (1,100 m), Freyung-Grafenau district, Bavarian Forest
 Geißkopf (1,097 m), Regen district, Bavarian Forest
 Hirschenstein (1,095 m), Straubing-Bogen district, Bavarian Forest
 Dreitannenriegel (1,092 m), Deggendorf district, Bavarian Forest
 Mühlriegel (1,080 m), Regen district, Bavarian Forest
 Schwarzkopf (1,060 m), Freyung-Grafenau district, Bavarian Forest
 Knogl (1,056 m), Straubing-Bogen district, Bavarian Forest
 Ödriegel (1,056 m), Regen district, Bavarian Forest
 Kälberbuckel (1,054 m), Straubing-Bogen district, Bavarian Forest
 Steinkopf (Mauth) (1,052), Freyung-Grafenau district, Bavarian Forest
 Rauher Kulm (1,050 m), Deggendorf district, Bavarian Forest
 Klausenstein (Bavaria) (1,048 m), Deggendorf district, Bavarian Forest
 Pröller (1,048 m), Straubing-Bogen district, Bayrischer Wald
 Hirschberg (1,039 m), Regen district, Bavarian Forest
 Rollmannsberg (1,042 m), Freyung-Grafenau district, Bavarian Forest
 Lichtenberg (1,028 m), Freyung-Grafenau district, Bavarian Forest
 Hochberg (1,025 m), Straubing-Bogen district, Bavarian Forest
 Predigtstuhl (1,024 m), Straubing-Bogen district, Bavarian Forest
 Vogelsang (1,022 m), Deggendorf district, Bavarian Forest
 Oberbreitenau (1,017 m), Deggendorf district, Bavarian Forest
 Brotjacklriegel (1,016 m), Freyung-Grafenau district, Bavarian Forest
 Schareben (1,015 m), Regen district, Bavarian Forest
 Kanzel (1,011 m), Freyung-Grafenau district, Bavarian Forest
 Käsplatte (979 m), Straubing-Bogen district, Bavarian Forest
 Hennenkobel (965 m), Regen district, Bavarian Forest
 Silberberg (955 m), Regen district, Bavarian Forest
 Gsengetstein (951 m), Regen district, Bavarian Forest
 Hausstein (917 m), Deggendorf district, Bavarian Forest
 Teufelstisch (901 m), Regen district, Bavarian Forest
 Büchelstein (832 m), Deggendorf district, Bavarian Forest

 Upper Palatinate 
 Kleiner Arber (1,384 m), Cham district, Bavarian Forest
 Zwercheck (1,333 m), Cham district, Bavarian Forest
 Großer Osser (1,293 m), Cham district, Bavarian Forest
 Enzian (1,285 m), Cham district, Bavarian Forest
 Kleiner Osser (1,266 m), Cham district, Bavarian Forest
 Heugstatt (1,261 m), Cham district, Bavarian Forest
 Schwarzeck (1,238 m), Cham district, Bavarian Forest
 Großer Riedelstein (1,132 m), on the border between Regen district and Cham district, Bavarian Forest
 Hoher Bogen (1,079 m), Cham district, Bavarian Forest
 Schwarzriegel (1,079 m), Cham district, Bavarian Forest
 Eckstein (1,073 m), Cham district, Bavarian Forest
 Hindenburgkanzel (1,049 m), Cham district, Bavarian Forest
 Rauchröhren (1,044 m), Cham district, Bavarian Forest
 Mittagstein (1,034 m), Cham district, Bavarian Forest
 Kreuzfelsen (999 m), Cham district, Bavarian Forest
 Burgstall (976 m), Cham district, Bavarian Forest
 Platte (946 m), Tirschenreuth district, Fichtelgebirge
 Entenbühl (901 m), Neustadt an der Waldnaab district, Upper Palatine Forest
 Weingartenfels (896 m), Schwandorf district, Upper Palatine Forest
 Signalberg (Upper Palatine Forest) (888 m), Schwandorf district, Upper Palatine Forest
 Reichenstein (874 m), Schwandorf district, Upper Palatine Forest
 Frauenstein (835 m), Schwandorf district, Upper Palatine Forest
 Schellenberg (829 m), Neustadt/WN district, Upper Palatine Forest
 Stückstein (808 m), Neustadt/WN district, Upper Palatine Forest
 Steinberg (802 m), Tirschenreuth district, Upper Palatine Forest
 Fahrenberg (801 m), Neustadt/WN district, Upper Palatine Forest
 Armesberg (731 m), Tirschenreuth district, Fichtelgebirge
 Rauher Kulm (682 m), Neustadt/WN district, Upper Palatine Forest
 Poppberg (652 m), Amberg-Sulzbach district, Franconian Jura
 Waldecker Schloßberg (641 m), Tirschenreuth district, Upper Palatine Forest
 Göschberg (621 m), Neumarkt in der Oberpfalz district, Franconian Jura
 Buchberg (607 m), Neumarkt in der Oberpfalz district, Franconian Jura
 Schauerberg (601 m), Neumarkt in der Oberpfalz district, Franconian Jura
 Dillberg (595 m), Neumarkt in der Oberpfalz district, Franconian Jura
 Parkstein (595 m), Neustadt/WN district, Upper Palatine Forest
 Anzenstein (593 m), Tirschenreuth district, Upper Palatine Forest
 Kastelstein (591 m), Neumarkt in der Oberpfalz district, Franconian Jura
 Wolfstein (580 m), Neumarkt in der Oberpfalz district, Franconian Jura

 Upper Franconia 
 Schneeberg (1,051 m), Wunsiedel im Fichtelgebirge district, Fichtelgebirge
 Ochsenkopf (1,024 m), Bayreuth district, Fichtelgebirge
 Nußhardt (972 m), Wunsiedel district, Fichtelgebirge
 Kösseine (939 m), Wunsiedel district, Fichtelgebirge
 Waldstein (877 m), Hof district, Fichtelgebirge
 Hohberg (863 m; Königsheide), Bayreuth district, Fichtelgebirge
 Kulm (853), Bayreuth district, Fichtelgebirge
 Kornberg (827 m), Hof district, Fichtelgebirge
 Epprechtstein (798 m), Wunsiedel district, Fichtelgebirge
 Döbraberg (794 m), Hof district, Franconian Forest
 Buchberg, Wunsidel im Fichtelgebirge district, Fichtelgebirge
 Kleiner Kulm (626 m), Bayreuth district, Franconian Jura
 Rupprechtshöhe (617 m), Bayreuth district, Franconian Switzerland
 Sophienberg 596 m Bayreuth district (Haag parish)
 Hohenmirsberger Platte (614 m), Bayreuth district, Franconian Switzerland
 Hetzleser Berg (Hetzlas or Leyerberg'') (549 m), Forchheim district, Franconian Switzerland
 Walberla (532 m), Forchheim district, Franconian Switzerland
 Buchberg (528 m), Coburg district, Lange mountains
 Hirschberg (493 m), Bayreuth district / Northeast Bavaria, Fichtelgebirge

Lower Franconia 
 Dammersfeldkuppe (928 m), Bavarian-Hessian border, Rhön
 Kreuzberg (928 m), Rhön-Grabfeld district, Rhön
 Heidelstein (926 m), Rhön-Grabfeld district, Rhön
 Eierhauckberg (910 m), Bavarian-Hessian border, Rhön
 Stirnberg (899 m), Bavarian-Hessian border, Rhön
 Hohe Hölle (894 m), Bavarian-Hessian border, Rhön
 Himmeldunkberg (888 m), Bavarian-Hessian border, Rhön
 Totnansberg (839 m; Black Mountains), Bad Kissingen district, Rhön
 Schwarzenberg (832 m; Black Mountains), Bad Kissingen district, Rhön
 Feuerberg (830 m), Bad Kissingen district, Rhön
 Kleiner Auersberg (809 m), Bad Kissingen district, Rhön
 Großer Auersberg (808 m), Bad Kissingen district, Rhön
 Querenberg (805 m), Rhön-Grabfeld district, Rhön
 Farnsberg (786 m), Bad Kissingen district, Rhön
 Hoher Dentschberg (778 m), Rhön-Grabfeld district, Rhön
 Lösershag (765 m), Bad Kissingen district, Rhön
 Gangolfsberg (737 m), Rhön-Grabfeld district, Rhön
 Platzer Kuppe (737 m; Black Mountains), Bad Kissingen district, Rhön
 Rother Kuppe (711 m), Rhön-Grabfeld district, Rhön
 Dreistelzberg (660 m), Bad Kissingen district, Rhön
 Geiersberg (586 m), Aschaffenburg district, Spessart
 Hermannskoppe (567 m), Bavarian-Hessian border, Spessart
 Querberg (567 m), Aschaffenburg district, Spessart
 Geierskopf (549 m), Aschaffenburg district, Spessart
 Weickertshöhe (545 m), Main-Spessart district, Spessart
 Steckenlaubshöhe (542 m), Main-Spessart district, Spessart
 Hoher Knuck (539 m), Main-Spessart district, Spessart
 Hohe Schule (538), Rhön-Grabfeld district, Rhön
 Hirschhöhe (537 m), Main-Spessart district, Spessart
 Sohlhöhe (530 m), Main-Spessart district, Spessart
 Obere Waldspitze (521 m), Bavarian-Hessian border, Spessart
 Geishöhe (521 m; with observation tower), Aschaffenburg district, Spessart
 Gauslkopf (519 m), Main-Spessart district, Spessart
 Rosskopf (Bavaria) (516 m), Bavarian-Hessian border, Spessart
 Großer Goldberg (515 m), Bavarian-Hessian border, Spessart
 Nassacher Höhe (512 m), Haßberge district, Haßberge Hills
 Steigkoppe (502 m), Aschaffenburg district, Spessart
 Pfirschhöhe (502 m), Main-Spessart district, Spessart
 Zabelstein (489 m), Schweinfurt district, Steigerwald
 Steinknückl (413 m), Aschaffenburg district, Spessart
 Eiersberg (349 m), municipality of Oberstreu

Middle Franconia 
 Hesselberg (689 m), Ansbach district, Franconian Jura, Wörnitz valley
 Dürrenberg (656 m), Weißenburg-Gunzenhausen district, Hahnenkamm (Altmühl Valley), Franconian Jura
 Efferaberg (645 m), Weißenburg-Gunzenhausen district, Hahnenkamm (Altmühl Valley), Franconian Jura
 Laubbichel (636 m), Weißenburg-Gunzenhausen district, Altmühl Valley Nature Park, Franconian Jura
 Hohenstein (634 m), Nürnberger Land district, Hersbruck Switzerland, Franconian Jura
 Leitenberg (616 m), Nürnberger Land district, Hersbruck Switzerland, Franconian Jura
 Dom (Nürnberger Land) (613 m), Nürnberger Land district, Hersbruck Switzerland, Franconian Jura
 Arzberg (612 m), Nürnberger Land district, Hersbruck Switzerland, Franconian Jura
 Schloßberg (607 m), bei Heideck, Roth district
 Moritzberg (603 m), Nürnberger Land district, Franconian Jura
 Großer Hansgörgel (601 m), Nürnberger Land district, Hersbruck Switzerland, Franconian Jura
 Hornberg (554 m), Ansbach district, Franconian Heights
 Birkenberg (547 m), Ansbach district, Franconian Heights
 Eichelberg (530 m), Ansbach district, Franconian Heights
 Laubersberg (517 m), Ansbach district, Franconian Heights
 Scheinberg (498 m), Neustadt (Aisch)-Bad Windsheim district, highest point of the Steigerwald
 Leitenberg (469 m), Roth district, Abenberg Forest, Georgensgmünd
 Schmausenbuck (390 m), town of Nuremberg, Franconian Jura

See also 
 List of the highest mountains in Germany
 List of the highest mountains in the German states
 List of mountain and hill ranges in Germany

!
Bavaria, mountains
Mount